Pietro Francesco Tagliapietra known as Francesco Paciotto (1521 - 1591) was an Italian military and civil architect, born and died in Urbino.

Biography
He was a pupil of Girolamo Genga at Urbino, before going to Rome to attend fhe Vitruvian Academy. 
He worked in Emilia for Farnese where Ottavio, second Duke of Parma and Piacenza, charged him for the first project, in 1558, of the Farnese palace in Piacenza.
Following the wife of Duke Ottavio, Margaret of Austria who was appointed by Philip II of Spain governor of Flanders, he moved from Italy to Flanders where he built the citadel of Antwerp.
Back to Italy he worked in Lucca where he contributed to design the fortified walls of the city.

References

Italian Renaissance architects
Italian Renaissance sculptors
1521 births
1591 deaths
People from Urbino
16th-century Italian architects
16th-century Italian sculptors
Italian male sculptors